There are over 20,000 Grade II* listed buildings in England. This page is a list of these buildings in the district of North Hertfordshire in Hertfordshire.

North Hertfordshire

|}

Notes

External links

Lists of Grade II* listed buildings in Hertfordshire
Grade II* listed buildings